José Antonio Álvarez Álvarez (born 1960) is vice chairman and CEO of Santander Group, the Spanish banking group centred on Banco Santander, the largest bank in the Eurozone by market value.

Álvarez has been CEO of Santander Group since January 2015 and an executive vice chairman since January 2019.

CEO of Banco Santander
He was appointed CEO at the group's council meeting in November 2014, replacing Javier Marín Romano.

References

1960 births
Living people
Spanish bankers
Spanish chief executives